The Women's Marathon at the 2001 World Championships in Edmonton, Alberta, Canada was held on Sunday August 12, 2001.

Medalists

Abbreviations
All times shown are in hours:minutes:seconds

Records

Intermediates

Final ranking

See also
 Women's Olympic Marathon (2000)
 2001 Marathon Year Ranking
 2001 World Marathon Cup

References
 Results
 IAAF

M
Marathons at the World Athletics Championships
2001 marathons
Women's marathons
World Championships in Athletics marathon
Marathons in Canada

nl:IAAF wereldkampioenschap marathon 2001